The 2002–03 Welsh Alliance League is the 19th season of the Welsh Alliance League, which is in the third level of the Welsh football pyramid.

The league consists of fifteen teams and concluded with Glantraeth as champions and promoted to the Cymru Alliance.

Teams
Amlwch Town were champions in the previous season and were promoted to the Cymru Alliance. They were replaced by Denbigh Town who were relegated from the Cymru Alliance, Gwynedd League champions, Bodedern Athletic and Clwyd League champions, Sealand Leisure.

Grounds and locations

League table

References

External links
Welsh Alliance League

Welsh Alliance League seasons
3
Wales